ISO 8373 Manipulating industrial robots – Vocabulary

It is the ISO standard that defines terms relevant to manipulating industrial robots operated in a manufacturing environment.

Revision information
 ISO/CD 8373

Corrigenda, Amendments and other parts
 ISO 8373:1994/Cor 1:1996 
 ISO 8373:1994/Amd 1:1996

References
ISO Catalogue in the ISO website

08373